Channel Island is a suburb of Darwin, in the Northern Territory of Australia. It is located in the local government area of Litchfield. Channel Island Power Station and the Darwin Aquaculture Centre are located on the island.

History
There was a leprosarium on Channel Island in the early 20th century. It was at a time when many Aboriginal people who were thought to have leprosy or other infectious diseases were sent to lock hospitals and leprosariums. They were often treated poorly, and they were cut off from their families.

Channel Island was the first quarantine venue in Northern Territory. The facilities and a hospital for quarantine purposes were established at Channel Island in 1914.

References

Suburbs of Darwin, Northern Territory
Leper colonies